Sean Kelley McKeever (born 1972) is an American comic book writer. Born in Appleton, Wisconsin he grew up in Eagle River.

Career
Since the end of his creator-owned teen drama series The Waiting Place, which was published from 1997 to 2002, McKeever has written several series for Marvel Comics, including The Incredible Hulk, Sentinel, Mary Jane, Inhumans and Gravity.

In 2005, he won an Eisner Award for Talent Deserving of Wider Recognition.

He has written for the monthly comic books Gravity, Marvel Adventures Spider-Man, Sentinel and Spider-Man Loves Mary Jane, all for Marvel Comics, and on January 9, 2007, DC Comics announced that McKeever had signed an exclusive contract with the publisher. He was a part of the writing team working on DC's weekly series Countdown, and took over for Gail Simone as the writer of Birds of Prey after issue #112, however, his last issue was #117 due to time constraints with deadlines. Sean also took up writing duties on Teen Titans with the double sized August issue #50 and also wrote the Terror Titans limited series that spun off from this. His run on Teen Titans has ended with issue #71, although he has continued with a Ravager back-up story starting in #72.

It was announced at Wizard World Philadelphia 2009 that McKeever, no longer under exclusive contract to DC, would write the limited series Nomad: Girl Without a World for Marvel Comics and this led into Young Allies a new series and team formed after the Heroic Age line-wide reboot, all with artist David Baldeon.

McKeever also wrote a new story for The Waiting Place illustrated by Mike Norton. The story was printed in The Waiting Place: The Definitive Edition from IDW Publishing.

Bibliography

Comics

Self-published
Counter 24-hour comic
Looking at the Front Door
The Meredith Club

Anarchy
Vampi: Vicious #1-3

Caliber
Negative Burn #30, 38, 44

DC Comics
Birds of Prey #113-117
Countdown Presents: The Search for Ray Palmer: Crime Society #1
Countdown to Final Crisis #47, 42, 39, 35, 31, 27, 18, 4, 3 & 2
Teen Titans #50-71, Annual 2009 #1 (Ravager co-feature from #72-80)
Terror Titans #1-6 (Limited Series)
Titans #11-13

Devil's Due
G.I. Joe: Frontline #9-10

Marvel Comics
Amazing Fantasy vol. 2 #15
Elektra: The Official Movie Adaptation
Firestar #1-
Gravity #1-5 (limited series)
Incredible Hulk #26, 30-32
Inhumans vol. 6 #1-12
Marvel Age Fantastic Four #1-4
Marvel Double Shot #3
Marvel Adventures Spider-Man #5-12
Mary Jane #1-4 (limited series)
Mary Jane: Homecoming #1-4 (limited series)
Mega Morphs toy insert mini-comics (6 total)
Mega Morphs #1-4 (limited series)
Mystique #14-24
Nomad: Girl Without a World  (with David Baldeon, 4-issue limited series, 2008)
Sentinel #1-12
Sentinel vol. 2 #1-5 (limited series)
Spider-Girl #51
Spider-Man Family #1-2
Spider-Man Family Featuring Spider-Man's Amazing Friends
Spider-Man Loves Mary Jane #1-20
Ultimate X-Men #75 (backup story)
Young Allies #1-6
X-Men Origins: Jean Grey

Sirius
Tower (2002)

SLG
Waiting Place, The #1-6
Waiting Place, The vol. 2 #1-12

Graphic novels and collected editions

About Comics
24 Hour Comics All-Stars (Softcover)

DC Comics
Birds of Prey: Metropolis or Dust (Softcover)
Countdown to Final Crisis vol. 1 (Softcover); vol. 2 (Softcover); vol. 3 (Softcover); vol. 4 (Softcover)
Countdown Presents: The Search for Ray Palmer (Softcover)
Teen Titans vol. 8: Titans of Tomorrow (Softcover)
Teen Titans vol. 9: On the Clock (Softcover)
Teen Titans vol. 10: Changing of the Guard (Softcover)
Teen Titans: Deathtrap (Softcover)
Terror Titans (Softcover)
Titans: Lockdown (Softcover)

Devil's Due
G.I. Joe: Frontline vol 4 - One-Shots (Softcover)
Lloyd Kaufman Presents: The Toxic Avenger And Other Tromatic Tales (Softcover)

IDW Publishing
Waiting Place: The Definitive Edition, The (Softcover)

Marvel Comics
Elektra: The Official Movie Adaptation (Softcover)
Gravity: Big-City Super Hero (Digest)
Inhumans vol 1: Culture Shock (Digest)
Marvel Age Fantastic Four vol 1: All For One (Digest)
Marvel Adventures Spider-Man vol 1 (Hardcover)
Marvel Adventures Spider-Man vol 2: Power Struggle (Digest)
Marvel Adventures Spider-Man vol 3: Doom With a View (Digest)
Mary Jane vol 1: Circle of Friends (Digest)
Mary Jane vol 2: Homecoming (Digest)
Mega Morphs (Digest)
Mini Marvels: Secret Invasion (Digest)
Mystique vol. 3: Unnatural (Softcover)
Mystique vol. 4: Quiet (Softcover)
Sensational Spider-Man: Back in Black (Hardcover); (Softcover)
Sentinel vol 1: Salvage (Digest)
Sentinel vol 2: No Hero (Digest)
Sentinel vol 3: Past Imperfect (Digest)
Spider-Man Family vol. 1: Back in Black (Digest)
Spider-Man Loves Mary Jane vol 1 (Hardcover)
Spider-Man Loves Mary Jane vol 2 (Hardcover)
Spider-Man Loves Mary Jane vol 1: Super Crush (Digest)
Spider-Man Loves Mary Jane vol 2: The New Girl (Digest)
Spider-Man Loves Mary Jane vol 3: My Secret Life (Digest)
Spider-Man Loves Mary Jane vol 4: Still Friends (Digest)
Spider-Man: Amazing Friends (Digest)
Ultimate X-Men vol. 8 (Hardcover)
Ultimate X-Men vol. 16: Cable (Softcover)
X-Men Origins (Hardcover)
Young Inhumans (Softcover)

SLG
Waiting Place Book One, The (Softcover)
Waiting Place Book Two, The (Softcover)
Waiting Place Book Three, The (Softcover)

Comic strips
Crankshaft 5/15/2006-5/20/2006 (uncredited writer)
Funky Winkerbean 4/10/2006-4/15/2006; 4/17/2006-4/22/2006; 5/22/2006-5/27/2006; 5/29/2006-6/3/2006; 6/19/2006-6/24/2006; plus an additional 10 weeks, Monday-Saturday (uncredited writer)

Characters created

Marvel
Alaris (with Matt Clark) first appeared in Inhumans vol. 6 #1
Aftershock (with Casey Jones) first appeared in Spider-Girl #51
Andy Anderson (with Patrick Scherberger) first appeared in Marvel Adventures Spider-Man #7
Black Death (with Mike Norton) first appeared in Gravity #1
Brushfire (with Mike Norton) first appeared in Gravity #5
Helena Carlson (with Manuel Garcia) first appeared in Mystique #14
Gravity/Greg Willis (with Mike Norton) first appeared in Gravity #1
Intello (with Mike Norton) first appeared in Marvel Adventures Spider-Man #11
Jolen (with Matt Clark) first appeared in Inhumans vol. 6 #1
Positron (with Kristian Donaldson) first appeared in Amazing Fantasy vol. 2 #15
San (with Matt Clark) first appeared in Inhumans vol. 6 #2
Juston Seyfert (with UDON) first appeared in Sentinel #1
Lauren Singh (with Mike Norton) first appeared in Gravity #1

Notes

References

External links

Article: Eisner-Award Winning Dreamer: Sean McKeever

1972 births
American comics writers
Living people
Writers from Appleton, Wisconsin
Eisner Award winners for Talent Deserving of Wider Recognition
People from Eagle River, Wisconsin